Katherine Inocencio (born September 15, 1960) is a broadcast journalist, child rights advocate, television producer and host in the Philippines. She was a candidate for Senator in the 2010 national elections under the Bangon Pilipinas Party of Bro. Eddie Villanueva.

Early life
A graduate of the University of the Philippines, Inocencio joined television network ABS-CBN in 1986. She covered President Corazon Aquino as a Malacanang Correspondent. She also anchored ABS-CBN's flagship newscast, TV Patrol with Noli de Castro and Frankie Evangelista from 1995 to 1996. Aside from ABS-CBN News, Inocencio was involved with ABS-CBN Foundation and produced and hosted its television program, Bantay Bata 163, a docu-drama program that campaigned against child abuse.

In August 2001, Inocencio left ABS-CBN to join a ministry that blessed Israel. She joined the Christian Broadcasting Network (CBN) as Vice President for Production in 2006. She hosted The 700 Club Asia on QTV3 with Peter Kairuz, Coney Reyes, Maricel Laxa-Pangilinan, Mari Kaimo, and Felici Pangilinan-Buizon. As Executive Producer of the 700 Club Asia, Kata produced several stories focusing on the plight of Overseas Filipino Workers2.

Inocencio also hosted the talk show Diyos at Bayan with Bro. Eddie Villanueva, aired on GMA News TV and GMA Network, from 2004 to 2014.

Political life
On November 30, 2009, Inocencio filed her Certificate of Candidacy as Senator at the Commission on Elections (Comelec)4 under Bangon Pilipinas Party.  Her platform focuses on the welfare of women and children, as well as fighting corruption.5 6

Personal life
Her maternal great-grandfather, Lope K. Santos, was a senator during the Quezon Administration, and governor of Rizal Province and Nueva Vizcaya.

References
2010 Philippine Senate election
ABS-CBN News and Current Affairs
1. Bangon Pilipinas Candidates file respective candidacies
2. 700 Club Asia on QTV
3. 700 Club Hosts
4. Eddie Villanueva files candidacy
5. Inocencio for Women and Children
6. Bangon Pilipinas gives genuine change a face

1960 births
Living people
Filipino television news anchors
Filipino television evangelists
ABS-CBN News and Current Affairs people
Women television journalists
21st-century Filipino women politicians
21st-century Filipino politicians